The Duquesne Weekend was a retreat for Duquesne University students which initiated the charismatic renewal in the Catholic Church. The retreat was held on February 17–19, 1967, at The Ark and the Dove retreat center in Gibsonia, Pennsylvania, United States.

Background 
In 1966, graduate student Ralph W. Keifer and history professor William G. Storey of Duquesne University began using the Pentecost sequence Veni Sancte Spiritus to pray for a new outpouring of the Holy Spirit. During this period they attended a Cursillo, and were given two books which describe the experience of baptism in the Holy Spirit: The Cross and the Switchblade and They Speak With Other Tongues.

In February 1967, Keifer and Storey were themselves baptized in the Holy Spirit at an Episcopalian charismatic prayer group. At the time, Keifer and Storey had already been organizing a student retreat, and, on account of their experience, they decided to center the retreat on the Holy Spirit.

Account of the retreat 
One of the retreatants, Patti Gallagher Mansfield, described the Saturday night of the retreat as follows: 

Many of the students, including Mangan, reported speaking in tongues that night in the chapel.

Aftermath 
Keifer sent the news of the retreat to the Catholics at the University of Notre Dame, where a similar event soon after occurred, and the baptism in the Holy Spirit began to spread. For example, by March 1967, Ralph C. Martin, a leader in the Cursillo movement, had become among the earliest beneficiaries of the Duquesne Weekend, and went on to become a major leader in the Catholic charismatic renewal.

References

External links 
 Ark and the Dove official website

February 1967 events in the United States
Catholicism
History of Allegheny County, Pennsylvania